Olga Dmitrievna Shkurnova (born March 23, 1962 in Odessa) is a former Soviet competitive volleyball player and Olympic gold medalist.

References

External links
 

Soviet women's volleyball players
Olympic volleyball players of the Soviet Union
Volleyball players at the 1988 Summer Olympics
Olympic gold medalists for the Soviet Union
1962 births
Sportspeople from Odesa
Living people
Ukrainian women's volleyball players
Russian women's volleyball players
Olympic medalists in volleyball
Medalists at the 1988 Summer Olympics
Honoured Masters of Sport of the USSR